Sopio Gvetadze (born November 15, 1983 in Tbilisi) is a Georgian chess player who holds the title of an international master and a woman grandmaster.

She qualified for the Women's World Chess Championship 2017, where she lost to Nino Batsiashvili.

External links

Living people
People from Tbilisi
1983 births
Chess woman grandmasters
World Youth Chess Champions
Female chess players from Georgia (country)
21st-century women from Georgia (country)